George A. Miller may refer to:

 George Abram Miller (1863-1951), mathematician
 George Armitage Miller (1920–2012), professor of psychology
 George Arthur Miller (1867–1935), British Olympic polo player

See also
George Miller (disambiguation)